EnLightnin'ment is a compilation album by singer-songwriter Lou Christie, released by Rhino on April 25, 1988.

Critical reception

Lynn Van Matre of the Chicago Tribune writes, "One of the big songs of 1966 was Christie's "Lightnin' Strikes," which sold more than a million copies, reached the No. 1 pop single spot, and now serves as the inspiration for the play-on-words title of a new CD collection of the singer-songwriter's vintage hits."

AllMusic gave the album 4½ out of a possible 5 stars.

Track listing (1988 LP & Cassette Tape release) 

Track information and credits adapted from the album's liner notes.

Production
Art Direction – Don Brown
Compilation – Gary Stewart, Harry Young
Design – Judy Bryan
Lacquer Cut By – Ken Perry
Photos, Liner notes – Harry Young
Project assistense – James Austin and Gary Peterson
Producers
Charles Calello (tracks A4, A7, B1 to B3, B5, B6), (tracks 16–17 on CD)
George Goldner (tracks A5)
Jack Nitzsche (tracks B4), (track 15 on CD)
Mike Duckman (tracks B7), (track 18 on CD)
Stan Vincent (tracks B7), (track 18 on CD)
Nick Cenci (tracks A1 to A3, A5, A6)
Bill Inglot – Compact Disc
Remastered by Bill Inglot
All the tracks on the CD were taken from absolute first generation master tapes.

References

External links
Lou Christie Official Site
Rhino Records Official Site

1988 compilation albums
albums produced by Charles Calello
albums produced by Jack Nitzsche
Rhino Entertainment compilation albums